Hancock is a town in Addison County, Vermont, United States. The town was named for John Hancock. The population was 359 at the 2020 census. Hancock is home to the Middlebury College Snow Bowl and contains Middlebury Gap through the Green Mountains.

Hancock was one of thirteen Vermont towns isolated by flooding caused by Hurricane Irene in 2011.

Geography
Hancock is located in eastern Addison County, extending from the crest of the Green Mountains in the west to the valley of the White River in the east. The village of Hancock lies along the White River at the confluence of the Hancock Branch from Middlebury Gap. Vermont Route 100 leads north-south through the town, following the White River, leading north into Granville and Warren, and south into Rochester and Stockbridge. Vermont Route 125 leaves Route 100 in Hancock village and leads west, across Middlebury Gap (elevation ) into Ripton and Middlebury. The Middlebury College Snow Bowl, a downhill ski area, is on the western side of Middlebury Gap. The Long Trail follows the crest of the Green Mountains in the western part of Hancock, crossing the summit of Worth Mountain and reaching the summit of Boyce Mountain a few feet north of the town boundary in Ripton. Texas Falls is a scenic waterfall on Hancock Branch that can be reached by road and has a Green Mountain National Forest recreation area nearby.

Demographics

As of the census of 2000, there were 382 people, 164 households, and 112 families residing in the town.  The population density was 9.9 people per square mile (3.8/km2).  There were 214 housing units at an average density of 5.6 per square mile (2.1/km2).  The racial makeup of the town was 96.60% White, 0.52% Native American, 0.79% Asian, 0.52% from other races, and 1.57% from two or more races. Hispanic or Latino of any race were 0.79% of the population.

There were 164 households, out of which 27.4% had children under the age of 18 living with them, 54.9% were married couples living together, 7.3% had a female householder with no husband present, and 31.1% were non-families. 28.0% of all households were made up of individuals, and 10.4% had someone living alone who was 65 years of age or older.  The average household size was 2.33 and the average family size was 2.77.

In the town, the age distribution of the population shows 20.9% under the age of 18, 7.3% from 18 to 24, 27.0% from 25 to 44, 29.3% from 45 to 64, and 15.4% who were 65 years of age or older.  The median age was 42 years. For every 100 females, there were 114.6 males.  For every 100 females age 18 and over, there were 108.3 males.

The median income for a household in the town was $29,583, and the median income for a family was $40,000. Males had a median income of $24,531 versus $21,875 for females. The per capita income for the town was $16,255.  About 6.6% of families and 8.4% of the population were below the poverty line, including 10.4% of those under age 18 and 7.8% of those age 65 or over.

Hancock is home to Camp Killooleet, which adds roughly 150 people to the population every summer.

Notable people

 Fred Thaddeus Austin, United States Army major general
 Jeremiah Ingalls, one of the first American composers

References

External links
 Town of Hancock official website

 
Towns in Vermont
Towns in Addison County, Vermont